Kerttu Pehkonen (October 26, 1928  – February 23, 2018) was the first female competitive cross-country skier who won numerous prestigious Nordic cross country competititons such as the Lahti Ski Games.

In 1947 Pehkonen won the first female Finnish Sports Personality of the Year award.

References

1928 births
2018 deaths
People from Joroinen
Finnish female cross-country skiers
20th-century Finnish women